Yuan Jing (1914 – 29 July 1999), born Yuan Xingzhuang, was a Chinese fiction writer, best known for her wartime novel Daughters and Sons (1949, co-authored with her then-husband Kong Jue), which was adapted into a successful 1951 film.

Yuan Jing came from a famous intellectual family. Her sister Yuan Xiaoyuan was China's first female diplomat. Scholar Yuan Xingpei is her cousin. Taiwan-based novelist Chiung Yao is a cousin-niece.

Yuan Jing joined the Communist Party of China in 1935 and went to Yan'an during the Second Sino-Japanese War where she began to write in several genres. During the Korean War she went to Korea as a journalist. Attacked during the Cultural Revolution, she resumed her writing in the 1980s, focusing on children's literature.

Works translated to English

References

1914 births
1999 deaths
Writers from Beijing
20th-century Chinese novelists
Chinese women novelists
20th-century women writers